Merredin was an electoral district of the Legislative Assembly in the Australian state of Western Australia from 1950 to 2008.

Originally known as Merredin-Yilgarn, the name was shortened in 1977. The district was located in the Wheatbelt region of Western Australia and was named for the town of Merredin.

Merredin was abolished in 2008 as a result of the reduction in rural seats made necessary by the one vote one value reforms. Its former territory was largely incorporated into the new seat of Central Wheatbelt, with parts also added to the districts of Moore and Wagin.

At various times, Merredin was held by all three of the major parties. The district was held by the Labor Party for all but three of its first 24 years. From 1977 onward, however, it became very safe for the National Party.

Geography
At its abolition, Merredin covered several inland rural shires. Its towns included Merredin, Dalwallinu, Wongan Hills, Cunderdin, Kellerberrin, Quairading, Bruce Rock and Corrigin.

Members for Merredin

Election results

External links
 
 
 

Merredin
Wheatbelt (Western Australia)